Vice Admiral  was commander of the Japan Maritime Self-Defense Force as well as an ace fighter pilot in the Imperial Japanese Navy (IJN) during the Second Sino-Japanese War and the Pacific theater of World War II. In aerial combat over China and the Pacific, he was officially credited with destroying 10 enemy aircraft.

During the Pacific campaign of World War II, Aioi participated in the conquest of the Philippines as a pilot aboard the aircraft carrier Ryūjō. Later, he served as a group leader in the 202 Air Group in the Solomon Islands Campaign. Aioi experienced the Battle of Leyte Gulf aboard the carrier Zuikaku in 1944. He ended the war as executive officer of the 343 Air Group in Japan.

In 1954, Aioi joined the JMSDF, eventually rising to the rank of vice admiral.

References

1912 births
1993 deaths
Japanese naval aviators
Japanese World War II flying aces
Military personnel from Hiroshima Prefecture
Japan Maritime Self-Defense Force admirals